Heidi Goossens (born 13 April 1969) is a Belgian judoka. She competed at the 1992 Summer Olympics and the 1996 Summer Olympics.

References

External links
 

1969 births
Living people
Belgian female judoka
Olympic judoka of Belgium
Judoka at the 1992 Summer Olympics
Judoka at the 1996 Summer Olympics
People from Herentals
Sportspeople from Antwerp Province